Olympia is the capital of the U.S. state of Washington and the county seat and largest city of Thurston County.

European settlers claimed the area in 1846, with the Treaty of Medicine Creek initiated in 1854, followed by the Treaty of Olympia in 1856. Olympia was incorporated as a town on January 28, 1859, and as a city in 1882. It had a population of 55,605 at the time of the 2020 census, making it the state's 23rd-largest city. Olympia borders Lacey to the east and Tumwater to the south.

History

The site of Olympia had been home to Lushootseed-speaking peoples known as the Steh-Chass (or Stehchass, later part of the post-treaty Squaxin Island Tribe) for thousands of years. Other Native Americans regularly visited the head of Budd Inlet and the Steh-Chass, including the other ancestor tribes of the Squaxin, as well as the Nisqually, Puyallup, Chehalis, Suquamish, and Duwamish. The first recorded Europeans came to Olympia in 1792. Peter Puget and a crew from the British Vancouver Expedition are said to have explored the site, but neither recorded any encounters with the resident Indigenous population. In 1846, Edmund Sylvester and Levi Lathrop Smith jointly claimed the land that is now downtown Olympia. In 1851, the U.S. Congress established the Customs District of Puget Sound for Washington Territory and Olympia became the home of the customs house. Its population steadily expanded from Oregon Trail immigrants. In 1850, the town settled on the name Olympia, at local resident Colonel Isaac N. Ebey's suggestion, because of its view of the Olympic Mountains to the northwest. The area began to be served by a small fleet of steamboats known as the Puget Sound Mosquito Fleet.

Over two days, December 24–26, 1854, Governor Isaac I. Stevens negotiated the Treaty of Medicine Creek with the representatives of the Nisqually, Puyallup, Squawksin, Steh'Chass, Noo-Seh-Chatl, Squi-Aitl, T'Peeksin, Sah-Heh-Wa-Mish, and S'Hotl-Ma-Mish tribes. Stevens's treaty included the preservation of Indigenous fishing, hunting, gathering and other rights. It also included a section which, at least as interpreted by United States officials, required the Native American signatories to move to one of three reservations. Doing so would effectively force the Nisqually people to cede their prime farming and living space. One of the leaders of the Nisqually, Chief Leschi, outraged, refused to give up ownership of this land and instead fought for his people's right to their territory, sparking the beginning of the Puget Sound War. The war ended with Leschi's execution.

In 1896, Olympia became the home of the Olympia Brewing Company, which brewed Olympia Beer until 2003.

The 1949 Olympia earthquake damaged many historic buildings beyond repair, and they were demolished. Parts of the city also suffered damage from earthquakes in 1965 and 2001.

Interstate 5 was built through the south side of the city in the late 1950s as a replacement for earlier highways that traveled through downtown Olympia. The freeway was originally planned to cut through the city, but was moved further out to save costs. It opened to traffic on December 12, 1958, and was later expanded in 1991.

Geography and climate

Olympia is at the southern end of Puget Sound on Budd Inlet. The Deschutes River estuary was dammed in 1951 to create Capitol Lake. Much of the lower area of downtown Olympia sits on reclaimed land. The cities of Lacey and Tumwater border Olympia.

The region surrounding Olympia has a warm-summer Mediterranean climate (Köppen Csb), whereas the local microclimate has dry summers and cool July and August overnight lows. It is part of USDA Hardiness zone 8a, with isolated pockets around Puget Sound in zone 8b. Most of western Washington's weather is brought in by weather systems that form near the Aleutian Islands in Alaska. It contains cold moist air, which brings western Washington cold rain, cloudiness, and fog. November through January are Olympia's rainiest months. City streets, creeks, and rivers can flood from November to February.

Olympia averages  of precipitation annually and has a year-round average of 75% cloud cover.

On average, 6.3 days annually reach , 1.8 days stay at or below freezing all day, and 78 nights reach the freezing mark. The average window for freezing temperatures is October 8 through May 3, allowing a growing season of 157 days, nearly 100 days shorter than in Seattle.

Parks

Olympia has a wide array of public parks and nature conservation areas. Percival Landing Park includes  of boardwalk along Budd Inlet, as well as a playground, picnic areas, and a large open space. The boardwalk leads north to an open-air amphitheater, a viewing tower beside the Port of Olympia, as well as the Olympia Farmers' Market. Percival Landing closed in 2010 for an extensive remodel after saltwater degradation and reopened in summer 2011. Watershed Park is the site of the former waterworks for the city and today has a loop trail with a large second-growth forest. Other parks include Priest Point Park, Burfoot Park, Woodruff Park, Sunrise Park, Yauger Park (home to one of Olympia's public skate parks), Friendly Grove (nestled in a small Eastside Community), and Trillium Park, which was created by the efforts of adjoining neighborhood associations with the easement of private property. The Nisqually National Wildlife Refuge is just outside Olympia, as is the Capitol State Forest.

Artesian water
Olympia was historically dependent on artesian waters. Early settlers in Swantown and Tumwater used artesian springs for their main water supply. The artesian spring at Fourth Avenue and Main Street (now called Capitol Way) was the main community well where settlers, as well as the local Steh-Chass and visiting Native Americans, gathered to socialize. Settler accounts recall paying Native Americans to collect water here. The artesian well at Artesian Commons park, a former parking lot, is active. Another still flows at the corner of Olympia Avenue and Washington Street. A small park was constructed around another spring in the Bigelow Neighborhood. The northeast end of Capitol Lake was the location of an artesian well until the construction of a new park that included changes to the shoreline. McAllister Springs, Olympia's main water source, is fed by artesian wells, and the former Olympia Brewery is supplied by 26 artesian wells.

Efforts to protect and preserve the free-flowing artesian well on 4th Ave in downtown Olympia began in 1991 when Jim Ingersoll, a local psychologist, called on the city council to acquire the well and develop it as a community park. Ingersoll's interest in the well started in a conversation with Dick Batdorf, co-founder of Batdorf & Bronson coffee roasting. Batdorf told Ingersoll that the secret to great coffee was great water – specifically artesian water. Ingersoll then met with Herb Legg and John Robinson, both of whom had worked in the 1950s and '60s to protect Watershed Park's artesian wells. Legg and Robinson worked behind the scenes to get an article published in the Olympian on February 24, 1992, calling for community support of the well. Ingersoll was then flooded with phone calls offering time, talent, resources and money. Legg and friends sponsored a public meeting at the Library, where more than 50 people each donated $50, and a single $3,000 donation followed the next day.

With hundreds of people using the well every day, community support grew to become "The Friends of Artesians", an informal organization of advocates who over 20 years mapped and researched the history of artesian wells in Olympia, raised money to test water quality and make improvements to the site and kept the vision of a free-flowing community well alive. In the fall of 2008, The Friends announced they would stop testing the water quality after February 2009. These actions renewed interest in protecting the well and led to the creation the nonprofit organization H2Olympia.

In downtown Olympia, efforts to preserve the use of artesian water at the one remaining public well has been the mission of H2Olympia: Artesian Well Advocates. In 2011, the city of Olympia committed $50,000 toward improvements of an artesian well in a parking lot that the city purchased the same year. Renovations at the well were completed in late 2011, including surface improvements, solar lighting, and a raised area to fill bottles. In spring 2012, sea-themed mosaic artwork created by community members was installed at the site of the well.

Demographics

2010 census
As of the census of 2010, there were 46,478 people, 20,761 households, and 10,672 families residing in the city. The racial makeup of the city was 83.7% White, 2.0% African American, 1.1% Native American, 6.0% Asian, 0.4% Pacific Islander, 1.8% from other races, and 5.0% from two or more races. Hispanic or Latino of any race were 6.3% of the population.

There were 20,761 households, of which 25.6% had children under the age of 18 living with them, 36.2% were married couples living together, 11.3% had a female householder with no husband present, 3.9% had a male householder with no wife present, and 48.6% were other families. 36.3% of all households were made up of individuals, and 11.7% had someone living alone who was 65 years of age or older. The average household size was 2.18 and the average family size was 2.83.

The median age in the city was 38 years. 19.5% of residents were under the age of 18; 11.2% were between the ages of 18 and 24; 28.5% were from 25 to 44; 26.7% were from 45 to 64; and 13.9% were 65 years of age or older. The gender makeup of the city was 47.3% male and 52.7% female.

2000 census
As of the census of 2000, there were 42,514 people, 18,670 households, and 9,968 families residing in the city. The population density was 2,544.4 people per square mile (982.3/km2). There were 19,738 housing units at an average density of 1,181.3 per square mile (456.1/km2). The racial makeup of the city was 85.3% White, 1.9% African American, 1.3% Native American, 5.8% Asian, 0.3% Pacific Islander, 1.7% from other races, and 3.8% from two or more races. Hispanic or Latino of any race were 4.4% of the population. 15.0% were of German, 11.3% Irish, 10.0% English, 6.0% Norwegian and 5.3% American ancestry. 91.6% spoke English, 2.9% Spanish and 1.7% Vietnamese as their first language.

There were 18,670 households, out of which 26.8% had children under the age of 18 living with them, 39.6% were married couples living together, 10.4% had a female householder with no husband present, and 46.6% were non-families. 35.2% of all households were made up of individuals, and 10.7% had someone living alone who was 65 years of age or older. The average household size was 2.21 and the average family size was 2.88.

In the city, the population was spread out, with 21.5% under the age of 18, 11.9% from 18 to 24, 30.4% from 25 to 44, 22.9% from 45 to 64, and 13.3% who were 65 years of age or older. The median age was 36 years. For every 100 females, there were 91.5 males. For every 100 females age 18 and over, there were 88.1 males.

The median income for a household in the city was $40,846, and the median income for a family was $54,136. Males had a median income of $41,267 versus $31,515 for females. The per capita income for the city was $22,590. About 6.9% of families and 12.1% of the population were below the poverty line, including 10.4% of those under age 18 and 6.3% of those age 65 or over.

Schools and universities
Olympia's main public school district is the Olympia School District. It enrolled 9,782 students in K-12 in the 2021–22 school year. The district has a total of 18 schools: 11 elementary schools, four middle schools and three high schools. Its high schools are Olympia High School (formally known as William Winlock Miller High School), Capital High School, and Avanti High School.

In the 2007–08 school year, Olympia began the Parent Partnership Program, which provides more opportunities to homeschooling families. Olympia's online high school, Olympia Regional Learning Academy (ORLA), is part of the same program. Private elementary schools include Olympia Waldorf School, Olympia Community School, St. Michael School, Holy Family, and Evergreen Christian. Private middle schools include Olympia Waldorf School and NOVA School. Pope John Paul II High School is a private high school.

In addition to primary and secondary schools, Olympia has a number of institutions of higher learning, including The Evergreen State College and South Puget Sound Community College. The Evergreen State College (TESC) offers bachelor's degrees in liberal arts and science, and master's degrees in environmental studies, public administration, education, and teaching. South Puget Sound Community College (SPSCC) offers associate degrees in arts, science, biology, elementary education, pre-nursing, applied science, general studies, and business.

Economy

According to Olympia's 2021 Annual Comprehensive Financial Report, the county's top employers are:

Arts

Olympia is a regional center for fine arts. A number of theatrical experiences are available with companies such as Animal Fire Theater, Olympia Family Theater, Olympia Little Theater, Goldfinch Productions, Broadway Olympia Productions, and Harlequin Productions at the historic State Theater. The Olympia Symphony Orchestra performs five regular-season concerts at the Washington Center and two pops concerts. The Masterworks Chorale Ensemble performs four regular-season concerts at the Washington Center for the Performing Arts.

Visual art venues include some of the local coffeehouses, Olympia Coffee Roasting Co., Batdorf & Bronson, and Burial Grounds downtown. Art House Designs is an art gallery that also hosts a jazz performance space. Murals and public art installations of sculpture are prevalent in Olympia and are especially featured on the State Capitol Campus and along Percival Landing on the urban waterfront. The Washington Center for the Performing Arts also presents visual art exhibitions throughout the season in its lobby areas.

Notable art venues near Olympia include Art in Ecology, housed in Washington Department of Ecology's 322,000-square-foot, three-story building on the campus of Saint Martin's University. Art in Ecology is a long-established art-in-the-workplace venue that has works by numerous northwest artists. Permanent installations by Alfredo Arreguin, commissioned by the Washington State Arts Commission, are accompanied by changing solo and group exhibitions throughout the year. Appointments to view the works are needed; tours take about an hour.

South Puget Sound Community College has a gallery in its Minnaert Center with rotating exhibitions. Evergreen State College, northwest of Olympia, has a professionally curated gallery with rotating shows in the Dan Evans Library building. South of Olympia, Monarch Contemporary Art Center and Sculpture Park has an 80-acre sculpture garden and art gallery.

Each year, the Olympia Film Society (OFS) produces a film festival and fosters film and video education in Olympia. It also shows independent, classic, and international films year-round at the art-deco Capitol Theater. A mostly volunteer-powered organization, OFS supports and presents a variety of cultural events, including All Freakin' Night, an all-night horror film screening with a cult following.

On the fourth Saturday in April, in honor of Earth Day, Olympia is host to one of the region's largest community celebrations – the Procession of the Species. Held in conjunction with the city's biannual Arts Walk, the Procession is organized by the community-based nonprofit organization Earthbound Productions, and is the culmination of an annual Community Art Studio that is free and open to the public. In its July 2009 Best of America feature, Reader's Digest magazine honored the Procession of the Species with the top spot in its "can't resist" parades and processions list. Open to all, the Procession of the Species attracts up to 30,000 viewers, while its costumed participants of all ages frequently number nearly 3,000. On the Friday evening before the Procession of Species, a Luminary Procession is held.

The Fleetwoods, a popular 1950s and 1960s doo-wop group, whose hits included "Come Softly to Me" and "Mr. Blue", originated in Olympia.

Sports
In 1984, Olympia hosted the U.S. Olympic women's marathon trial. The winner of the event was Joan Benoit, who won a gold medal at the first women's Olympic marathon at the 1984 Summer Olympic games in Los Angeles.

Olympia is the home of the Oly Rollers, the local women's flat track roller derby league whose travel team, the Cosa Nostra Donnas, were the 2009 national champions of the Women's Flat Track Derby Association (WFTDA), winning the national Declaration of Derby tournament in Philadelphia, Pennsylvania.

Oly Town FC (also known as Oly Town Artesians) is a soccer club that was founded in 2014 and primarily plays at Black Hill High School. They field an amateur men's team in USL League Two and the Evergreen Premier League, as well as a women's team in the Northwest Premier League.

Transportation

Rail
Amtrak provides service to Olympia-Lacey at Centennial Station. Amtrak train 11, the southbound Coast Starlight, departs Olympia at 11:19am with service to Centralia; Portland; Sacramento; Emeryville, California (with bus connection to San Francisco); and Los Angeles. Amtrak train 14, the northbound Coast Starlight, departs Olympia at 6:01pm daily with service to Tacoma and Seattle. Amtrak Cascades trains, operating as far north as Vancouver and as far south as Eugene, Oregon, serve Olympia-Lacey several times daily in both directions.

Bus

Olympia, Lacey, Tumwater, and the surrounding area are primarily served by Intercity Transit, with connections to Grays Harbor Transit, Mason Transit Authority, Pierce Transit, Sound Transit, and Twin Transit. Intercity Transit maintains a free shuttle route called "Dash". Dash runs from the Capitol Campus to the Farmers Market at the far edge of downtown. Intercity Transit's Olympia Express provides service to Lakewood and Tacoma, with connections to regional bus and commuter rail service. In 2009 Intercity Transit won an award for America's best Public Transportation System in the midsize category by the American Public Transportation Association. The fleet runs entirely on biodiesel fuel and is composed of about 20% biodiesel-electric hybrid buses.

Airport
Olympia Regional Airport is just south of Olympia in Tumwater. It is operated by the Port of Olympia and serves general aviation as well as corporate aviation. The airport hosts the Olympic AirShow, a medium-sized airshow that occurs on Father's Day weekend each year.

Media
Robust journalism in Olympia dates to before Washington Territory's incorporation in 1853.

The Olympian is the local daily newspaper. The Tacoma-based Weekly Volcano has covered Olympia entertainment since 2001. Progressive newspaper Works in Progress is published monthly. The statewide government channel TVW is based in Olympia. Online outlet NorthAmericaTalk, an aggregate for local community news and marketing, was established with headquarters in Olympia.

Olympia and Thurston County are included in the Seattle-Tacoma designated market area (DMA), and therefore are chiefly served by Seattle's network-affiliated television stations and some radio stations. Since 1983, Olympia has had a public, educational and government access television station, which was rebranded in 2016 as Thurston Community Media. Olympia sits on the southern fringe of the FM signal of National Public Radio member station KUOW. An AM simulcast is transmitted from a tower in nearby Tumwater. Evergreen State College's KAOS broadcasts a mix of educational and political programming, with student-driven music shows.

Notable people

US Soccer goalkeeper Kasey Keller was born in Olympia. He played for Seattle Sounders FC until 2011, after playing for clubs in England, Spain and Germany. 
The 1990s riot grrrl feminist punk movement, which included bands like Bikini Kill and Bratmobile, originated in Olympia. 
Entrepreneur Christopher Hedrick grew up in Olympia and was inducted into the Olympia High School Hall of Fame.
 Don Rich, lead guitarist for Buck Owens, was raised in Olympia.
Grammy-winning musician Rickie Lee Jones attended high school in Olympia.
Nathan and Aaron Weaver of Atmospheric Black Metal band Wolves in the Throne Room live in Olympia.
Geoff Jenkins, Major League Baseball outfielder, was born in Olympia.
Calvin Johnson, of the band Beat Happening and founder of Olympia-based record label K Records, lives in Olympia. 
Peter Kennedy, five-time national champion and 1952 Winter Olympics silver medalist in pairs figure skating, was born in Olympia.
Kimya Dawson, singer-songwriter and member of The Moldy Peaches, is a resident of Olympia. 
Gary Toxel of the popular doo-wop group The Fleetwoods, whose hits included Come Softly to Me and Mr. Blue.
USA Rugby player Scott LaValla was born and raised in Olympia and graduated from North Thurston High School. He later played for Stade Français in Paris, France.
Artist Nikki McClure lives in Olympia.
New York Times bestselling author Jim Lynch lives in Olympia.
Kurt Cobain of the band Nirvana lived at 114 Pear St NE from 1987 to 1991.
Colin O'Brady, endurance athlete and mountain climber, was born and grew up in Olympia.
William Henry Mitchell, pioneer and sheriff

International relations

Twin towns and sister cities
Olympia is twinned with:

  Katō, Hyōgo, Japan.
  Rafah, Palestine

A previous sister city agreement with Olympia, Greece is no longer in effect.

See also

Bigelow House
Capital City Pride – Community Lesbian, Gay, Bisexual and Transgender (LGBT) Festival
Washington State Capitol
Freechild Institute for Youth Engagement – Nonprofit organization in Olympia
Capitol Lakefair – Annual festival in Olympia
Music of Olympia, Washington
Port Militarization Resistance
USS Olympia, 2 ships

References

External links

City of Olympia
Olympia Historical Society

Convention and Visitors Bureau

 
Cities in Washington (state)
Cities in Thurston County, Washington
Cities in the Seattle metropolitan area
County seats in Washington (state)
Populated places established in 1853
1853 establishments in Washington Territory
Native American history
Native American history of Washington (state)
Pre-statehood history of Washington (state)